A rector of a Dutch university is called a rector magnificus. The following people have been rector magnificus of the Erasmus University Rotterdam:

External links 
 Website Erasmus Universitey Rotterdam

Lists of office-holders in the Netherlands
Science-related lists
Erasmus University Rotterdam